Wah Yan may refer to:
Wah Yan College, Hong Kong
Wah Yan College, Kowloon
Wah Yan College Cats
Wah Yan Dramatic Society
Wah Yan One Family Foundation